is the second studio album by Japanese girl idol group S/mileage. It was released on 22 May 2013 on the label Hachama.

Release 
The album was released in 2 versions: a regular edition and a limited edition. The limited edition contained an additional DVD.

The album contained 10 tracks on the CD: 3 songs that were originally released as A-sides of 3 physical singles and 7 new songs.

Chart performance 
The album debuted at number 13 in the Japanese Oricon weekly albums chart.

Personnel 
Members of S/mileage:
 Ayaka Wada
 Kanon Fukuda
 Kana Nakanishi
 Akari Takeuchi
 Rina Katsuta
 Meimi Tamura

Track listing

Charts

References

External links 
 Profile of the album on the official website of Hello! Project
 Profile of the album on the official website of Up-Front Works

Angerme albums
2013 albums
Hachama albums
Japanese-language albums